Griffey is an anglicisation of the Irish Gaelic surname Ó Gríofa. This surname was also anglicised to Griffin.

Griffey may refer to:

 Anthony Dean Griffey (born 1970), American operatic tenor
 Carolyn Griffey, American soul vocalist and member of the soul funk group Shalamar
 Dan Griffey (born 1970), American politician
 Dick Griffey (1938-2010), American record producer and promoter, father of Carolyn Griffey
 Ken Griffey Jr. (born 1969), former Major League Baseball player
 Ken Griffey Sr. (born 1950), former Major League Baseball player, father of Ken Griffey Jr.